Yunus Bahadır (born 7 August 2002) is a Belgian footballer who plays as a right-back for Turkish club Alanyaspor.

Club career
On 1 August 2022, Bahadır signed a three-year contract with Alanyaspor.

International career
Bahadır was born in Belgium and is of Moroccan and Turkish descent. He is a former youth international for Belgium, having represented the Belgium U16s, U17s, and U19s. He was first called up to the Turkey U21s in May 2022 for a set of 2023 UEFA European Under-21 Championship qualification matches.

References

External links
 ACFF Profile

2002 births
Living people
Footballers from Liège
Belgian footballers
Belgium youth international footballers
Belgian people of Turkish descent
Belgian sportspeople of Moroccan descent
R. Charleroi S.C. players
Jong PSV players
Alanyaspor footballers
Eerste Divisie players
Association football fullbacks
Belgian expatriate footballers
Belgian expatriate sportspeople in the Netherlands
Expatriate footballers in the Netherlands